Pamela Aslı Spence (born 25 February 1973) is a Turkish-English pop-rock singer and actress.

Born to an English father and a Turkish mother, she sings in Turkish, which she learned at the age of 15. She has also collaborated with a number of other Turkish singers and performed in several musicals.

Spence studied Theater Arts at the Ankara State Conservatory. At the age of 19, she had a short-lived marriage to actor Burak Sergen. She was first noticed by critics in a musical version of They Shoot Horses, Don't They? staged in Turkey, where she had acted alongside actors Okan Bayülgen and Fikret Kuşkan. She then starred in TV miniseries such as Lahmacun ve Pizza, and took part in Teoman's group of vocalists.

Her first album, Eğer Dinlersen, was the product of a long period of preparation. With the songs in her second album, Şehir Rehberi, she used a style that was closer to rock music, as opposed to the pop notes of her first album. One of the songs from her second album, "İstanbul", attracted great public attention. In May 2006, she produced her third album, Cehennet.

Discography

Studio albums
 2002: Eğer Dinlersen
 2004: Şehir Rehberi
 2006: Cehennet  (a blend word combining the words "cehennem" - hell and "cennet"- paradise)
 2010: Stil Zengini
 2018: Yara

Single 
2013: "Aç"
2015: "Aslanlar Gibi"
2020: "Dayanamıyorum" (Attila Özdemiroğlu Besteleri)
2021: "Benimle Kal" (Çelik Şarkıları)
2021: "Her Şeye Rağmen" (with Mehmet Güreli)
2021: "Başka Bir Gün" (with Batu Akdeniz)
2022: "Yedikule" (Yeni Türkü Zamansız)

Filmography 
 2015: Acil Aşk Aranıyor - Herself
 2011: +18 - Hayal
 2010: Vay Arkadaş - Sevtap
 2008: Avrupa Yakası - Herself
 2008: Pulsar - Pussy Girl
 2007: Kelebek Çıkmazı - Lale
 2007: Ters Yüz - Ayşe 
 2007: Gönül Salıncağı - Aslı
 2005: Tombala - Derya
 2004: Mucizeler Komedisi - Female Angel
 2004: Sil Baştan 
 2004: Mars Kapıdan Baktırır -  Nazlı
 2003: Büyümüş de Küçülmüş - Nazlı
 2002: Lahmacun ve Pizza - Tuğçegül
 2002: Ti Show - Female Robot
 2000: Ruhsar - Girl
 1999: 5 Maymun Çetesi - Kelly
 1997: Ruhsar - Tomris

References

External links
 

1975 births
Living people
Turkish pop singers
Hacettepe University Ankara State Conservatory alumni
21st-century Turkish women singers
21st-century Turkish singers